Ján Veizer (born 22 June 1941) is the Distinguished University Professor (emeritus) of Earth Sciences at the University of Ottawa and Institute for Geology, Mineralogy und Geophysics, of Bochum Ruhr University. He held the NSERC/Noranda/CIFAR Industrial Chair in Earth System Isotope and Environmental Geochemistry until 2004.  He is an isotope geochemist; his research interests have included the use of chemical and isotopic techniques in determining Earth's climatic and environmental history.

Born in Pobedim, Slovakia, Veizer has received the Killam Award (Canada Council, 1986), the 1987 W.W. Hutchison Medal for young individuals making exceptional advances in Canadian earth science research; the 1991 Willet G. Miller Medal for outstanding contributions in geology; the 1992 Gottfried Wilhelm Leibniz Prize, which carried a 1.55 million euro value, awarded for understanding of the geochemistry of sediments; the 1995 Logan Medal which is the Geological Association of Canada's highest honour; the 2000 Bancroft Award for contributions furthering the public understanding of the Earth sciences.

Cosmic rays and climate change 
In a letter to Nature, Veizer et al.(2000), compared the reconstruction of tropical sea surface temperatures throughout the Phanerozoic eon (the past ~550 Myr)  with the variable galactic cosmic rays and concluded that their results can be reconciled if atmospheric carbon dioxide concentrations were not the principal driver of climate variability on geological timescales for at least one-third of the Phanerozoic eon, or if the reconstructed carbon dioxide concentrations are not reliable.

In 2003, together with Nir J. Shaviv, an Israeli astrophysicist, Veizer published a paper in GSA Today suggesting a reduced (capped) influence of carbon dioxide to climate change and attributing a more significant influence to cosmic rays. Veizer and Shaviv commented that their model on a doubled carbon dioxide content in the last century would result in a warming of 1.5 °C, according to Veizer and Shaviv in line with the minimum level of the IPCC estimate between 1.5 and 4.5 °C.

However, the paper was criticized by a subsequent publication in 2004 by Stefan Rahmstorf and other climate scientists in the journal Eos (American Geophysical Union), in which the authors wrote, "The
correlation of CRF [cosmic ray flux] and climate over the past 520 m.y. appears to not hold up under scrutiny".

Selected publications 

 
 
 
 
 
 
 Veizer, J. (2005). Celestial climate driver: a perspective from four billion years of the carbon cycle. Geoscience Canada, 32, 13-28.

References

External links
Jan Veizer, University of Ottawa
Climate History Christopher Scotese Display of ancient climates on Paleomap Project

1941 births
Living people
Gottfried Wilhelm Leibniz Prize winners
Logan Medal recipients
People from Nové Mesto nad Váhom District
Academic staff of the University of Ottawa
Canadian people of Slovak descent
Slovak geochemists
Fellows of the Royal Society of Canada